The Manning River snapping turtle (Myuchelys purvisi) is a species of turtle in the family Chelidae. It is endemic to Australia.

References

External links 
 
 
 The Aussie Manning River Turtle Ark Conservation Project

Turtles of Australia
Myuchelys
Taxonomy articles created by Polbot
Reptiles described in 1985